Make Me Prime Minister is a 2022 British reality game show. The programme features political tasks said to be based on the role of Prime Minister in the United Kingdom. The series features contestants competing to be made Channel 4's "alternative prime minister". The critical response to the programme has been mixed but broadly negative.

Production and format 
The programme is co-produced by Twofour, Accidentally on Purpose (AOP) and Motion Content Group, and is funded by Channel 4. There are six episodes the first of which aired on 27 September. 

The programme required contestants to complete tasks modelled on Government and politics in a structure similar to The Apprentice. They were guided by Alastair Campbell and Sayeeda Warsi. Former prime ministers Tony Blair of the Labour party and David Cameron of the Conservative party were featured.

Series overview

Contestants 
The series featured twelve candidates of various political leanings. They were described in a press release by Channel 4 as "ordinary yet opinionated". The group included Jackie Weaver, a local government employee who gained attention during the COVID-19 pandemic when a video of her managing a confrontational council meeting over Zoom was widely viewed online. 

Source:

Performance chart 

Key:

Episodes

Reception 
Much of the critical response to the programme was negative with multiple reviews drawing negative comparisons to business-themed reality TV series The Apprentice. A review in Metro described the series as "a total rip-off".  A review in the i argued that the series had "neither the gravitas of actual politics nor the ding-dong irascibility of reality telly... While recent political scenes might lead us to believe otherwise, politics is a serious business. And serious TV and reality entertainment are a match fated to go down in the dreariest of flames." A reviewer in The Telegraph commented that the show "shines a light on the basic practices and structures of a political operation, but never quite rises above cosplay. I'm not yet convinced it’s got my vote." An article in UnHerd argued that the TV series reflected a wrong-headed attitude which belittled political expertise and argued that effective leadership could purely be provided by common sense. An article in the New Statesman was critical of the programme suggesting that it was reflective of an attitude which saw politics as a silly, humorous game and belittled its real-life consequences. The magazine's formal review concluded that "For weary audiences, watching individuals questionably fit for public office argue and flounder is less entertainment and more, well, The News."

A more positive review in The Independent described the programme's purpose as "to entertain and to educate us a little" and commented that "I have to say, having been badly jaundiced by over-exposure to politics and politicians over some decades, I am pleasantly surprised at how well the show works. Somehow it actually manages to make the political process look like God’s work.  A minor miracle." Lucy Mangan in The Guardian attested to a personal dislike for the contestants and judges, but considered that the programme worked on its own merits, concluding: "Technically it's worth five stars. In every other way, I wish I was dead."  A neutral review in The Times said of the programme: "Really it is neither good nor bad, but merely the exact result of saying, 'Let’s remake The Apprentice, almost frame by frame, but this time about politics.'"

References

External links
 

2022 British television series debuts
2020s British reality television series
2020s British political television series
Television shows set in London
English-language television shows
Channel 4 reality television shows
Works about prime ministers of the United Kingdom
Television series by ITV Studios
Television shows set in Shropshire